The 36th Vojvodina Division was a Yugoslav Partisan division that fought against the Germans, Independent State of Croatia (NDH) and Chetniks in occupied Democratic Federal Yugoslavia during World War II. 

When it was created it consisted mostly of Serbs recruited from Hungarian–occupied Bačka. As part of the Partisan 3rd Corps then Partisan 12th Corps it spent most of 1944 engaged in hard fighting against the 13th Waffen Mountain Division of the SS Handschar (1st Croatian) in eastern Bosnia.

The Division also participated in the Battle of Batina (November 1944).

Notes

References
 
 
 
 
 

Divisions of the Yugoslav Partisans
Military units and formations established in 1944
Military units and formations disestablished in 1945